Enrique Hernández (born 13 July 1945) is a Puerto Rican weightlifter. He competed in the men's featherweight event at the 1968 Summer Olympics.

References

1945 births
Living people
Puerto Rican male weightlifters
Olympic weightlifters of Puerto Rico
Weightlifters at the 1968 Summer Olympics
People from Santurce, Puerto Rico
20th-century Puerto Rican people